Old Baptist Parsonage is a historic church parsonage at 547 Park Avenue in Scotch Plains, Union County, New Jersey, United States. It is associated with the historic Scotch Plains Baptist Church and cemetery.

It still stands on the original site where it was built in 1786. This structure was the first stone parsonage of Essex County, which included what is now Union County. The wood frame addition was added in 1810.

The parsonage was added to the National Register in 1973.

References

Baptist churches in New Jersey
Properties of religious function on the National Register of Historic Places in New Jersey
Churches completed in 1786
Houses in Union County, New Jersey
Scotch Plains, New Jersey
National Register of Historic Places in Union County, New Jersey
Clergy houses in the United States
18th-century Baptist churches in the United States